Omoglymmius ichthyocephalus is a species of beetle in the subfamily Rhysodidae. It was described by Lea in 1904.

References

ichthyocephalus
Beetles described in 1904